Minuscule 137 (in the Gregory-Aland numbering), A153 (Soden), is a Greek minuscule manuscript of the New Testament, on parchment leaves. Palaeographically it has been assigned to the 12th century. It has marginalia.

Description 

The codex contains the text of the four Gospels on 300 thick parchment leaves (size ), with a commentary. The text is written in one column per page, 19 lines per page (size of column 14.5 by 11.8 cm).

There is also another division according to the smaller Ammonian Sections (Mark 233 – 16:8; in a commentary 234 – 16:9). There are no references to the Eusebian Canons.

Victor's commentary to Mark appears.

Text 

The Greek text of the codex is a representative of the Byzantine text-type. Aland placed it in Category V.

According to the Claremont Profile Method it represents textual family Kx in Luke 1 and Luke 10. In Luke 20 it has a mixture of the Byzantine text-types. It creates textual cluster 137.

History 

At the end we read: κσ φραγκισκος ακκιδας ευγενες κολασσευς... ρωμη ηγαγε το παρον βιβλιον ετει απο αδαμ ζφω [A.D. 1583], μηνι ιουλιω, ινδ. ια. This means the manuscript was brought to Rome in 1583.

It was partially examined by Birch (about 1782). C. R. Gregory saw the manuscript in 1886.

It is currently housed at the Vatican Library (Vat. gr. 756), at Rome.

See also 
 List of New Testament minuscules
 Biblical manuscript
 Textual criticism

References

Further reading 

 

Greek New Testament minuscules
12th-century biblical manuscripts
Manuscripts of the Vatican Library